Bradlec is a municipality and village in Mladá Boleslav District in the Central Bohemian Region of the Czech Republic. It has about 1,300 inhabitants.

Etymology
The name is derived from bradlo, meaning "rocky formation".

Geography
It lies mostly in the Jičín Uplands, only a small parts of the municipal territory extend into the Jizera Table.

The municipality is located on an elevation of volcanic origin above the Jizera river valley. There are two small flooded quarries in the centre of Bradlec.

History
The first written mention of Bradlec is from 1382. The village was founded by Knights Hospitaller around 1250.

Sights
Bradlec is poor in monuments. There are only a small chapel and a wayside cross.

References

External links

Villages in Mladá Boleslav District